Kadir Çakır (born 10 March 1990) is a Turkish curler.

Teams

Men's

Mixed

Mixed doubles

References

External links

 
 Video: 

Living people
1990 births
Turkish male curlers
Place of birth missing (living people)
21st-century Turkish people